A tacit assumption or implicit assumption is an assumption that underlies a logical argument, course of action, decision, or judgment that is not explicitly voiced nor necessarily understood by the decision maker or judge. These assumptions may be made based on personal life experiences, and are not consciously apparent in the decision making environment. These assumptions can be the source of apparent paradoxes, misunderstandings and resistance to change in human organizational behavior.

See also

 Assumption-based planning
 Consensus reality
 Hidden curriculum
 Implicit attitude
 Implicit cognition
 Implicit leadership theory
 Implicit memory
 Implied consent
 Leading question
 Premise
 Presupposition
 Shattered assumptions theory
 Subreption
 Tacit knowledge
 Unsaid
 Unspoken rule

Further reading
 Edgar H. Schein, Organizational Culture and Leadership, Jossey-Bass, 2004, 

Logic
Ignorance

ja:暗黙の了解